Zaplyusye is an urban locality (a work settlement) in Plyussky District of Pskov Oblast, Russia, located in the east of the district, right at the border with Leningrad Oblast. Municipally, it is incorporated as Zaplyusye Urban Settlement in Plyussky Municipal District, one of the two urban settlements in the district. Population:

History
In 1953, preparatory works started from the Zaplyusskiye Mkhi peat deposit. In 1955, a settlement of Zaplyusye was founded to serve the production. At the time, it was already a part of Plyussky District of Pskov Oblast. The production started in 1958. The entire production of the deposit was to serve the city of Leningrad, and the peat plant was a part of Lentorf, the enterprise producing peat in Leningrad Oblast. In 1961, Zaplyusye was granted urban-type settlement status. It became the first urban-type settlement in the district: the district's administrative center, Plyussa, remained a rural locality until 1971.

Economy

Industry
Zaplyusye is essentially centered on a single enterprise, Rostorfinvest, which specializes in peat production.

Transportation
Zaplyusye is located on the M20 highway which connects Saint Petersburg and Pskov.

References

Notes

Sources

Urban-type settlements in Pskov Oblast